Loeb was a Canadian supermarket chain. Founded in Ottawa, Ontario, Loeb expanded across Canada, and into parts of the United States. The company was acquired by the Quebec-based supermarket chain Metro in 1999, and its stores were converted to the Metro brand in 2008.

History
Loeb began in 1912 when Moses Loeb opened a small wholesale confectionery house in Ottawa. By 1950, Loeb grew into two large warehouses, and the following two decades were those of lucrative business ventures. Through partnerships with other companies into the 1980s, Loeb continued to serve the needs of people throughout Canada and the United States.

In 1990, Loeb launched its own brand of private label products, called 'Loeb Made Today', followed by 'Loeb Ready' products.

In the early 1990s, Loeb had mascot characters named "Koo-Kie" and "Handy and Dandy".

Acquisition by Metro
In June 1999, Loeb became part of the Metro Foods corporate group. At the time, it was owned by Provigo, which was sold the previous year to Loblaw Companies, which was required to resell Loeb for competitive reasons. Following the purchase, Metro began putting products from its own house brands, Merit/Selection and Irresistibles, on the shelves of Loeb stores.

In 2006, following Metro's acquisition of The Great Atlantic & Pacific Company of Canada, Loeb became a subsidiary of A&P Canada. New products and services were introduced to Loeb stores, and the Merit, Econochoix, and Irresistible lines were dropped in favour of A&P Canada's own Master Choice, Equality and Baker's Oven products, along with Fresh Obsessions produce.

On August 7, 2008, Metro announced it would invest $200 million consolidating the company's conventional food stores under the Metro banner. Over a period of 15 months, all Loeb stores were converted to the Metro name. The rebranding also saw the Irresistibles and Selection brands return to the stores, replacing those inherited from A&P.

Advertising slogans
1998–2002: Real Values (Get Real... Real Saving, Real Quality, Real Variety & Real Freshness)
2002–2004: For What's Important in Life
2004–2009: Just What You Need, Lunch Box Treats for Kids of All Ages!, Cut Your Way Everyday!, Freshness to Go!

Private labels
Selection
Econochoice
Irresistibles
Loeb Bakery Shoppe
The Event Pleaser
Red Grill Meats

Former brands (2006 to 2008):
Fresh Obsessions
Master Choice
Basics for Less
Equality

See also
List of Canadian supermarkets

References

External links
Loeb Official website.

Metro Inc.
Defunct supermarkets of Canada
Companies based in Ottawa
Retail companies established in 1912
Retail companies disestablished in 2009